The Ransom County Courthouse in Lisbon, North Dakota was designed in the Art Deco style by architect Ira Rush.  It was built in 1937 and was listed on the U.S. National Register of Historic Places in 1985.
  Ira Rush designed several courthouses in North Dakota in the Art Deco style; other examples include the Sheridan County Courthouse and Burleigh County Courthouse.

References

Courthouses on the National Register of Historic Places in North Dakota
County courthouses in North Dakota
Art Deco architecture in North Dakota
Government buildings completed in 1937
National Register of Historic Places in Ransom County, North Dakota
Lisbon, North Dakota
1937 establishments in North Dakota